Bjarne Mørk Eidem (4 October 1936 – 2 October 2022) was a Norwegian politician for the Labour Party. He was chairman of the Norwegian Aquaculture Center in Brønnøy.

Biography
Bjarne Mørk Eidem was a member of the Norwegian Parliament from 1969 to 1993, representing Nordland. He was made Minister of Fisheries in the second cabinet of Gro Harlem Brundtland from 1986 to 1989, as well as minister of Nordic cooperation. Mørk Eidem resigned on 10 October, six days before the cabinet. From 1990 to 2005, he was Auditor General of Norway.

References

1936 births
2022 deaths
People from Vega, Norway
Government ministers of Norway
Labour Party (Norway) politicians
Auditors general of Norway
Members of the Storting
20th-century Norwegian politicians